George Hebden may refer to:
 George Hebden (footballer)
 George Hebden (cricketer)